I Met You When I Was 18 (The Playlist) is a compilation album by American singer-songwriter Lauv. It was released on May 31, 2018 by AWAL. The singer describes the album as a "playlist".

The album debuted at number 50 on the US Billboard 200 with 11,000 album equivalent units.

Track listing
Credits adapted from Tidal and Genius.

Charts

Certifications

References 

2018 compilation albums
Lauv albums